During the 1962-63 season Football Club Internazionale Milano competed in Serie A and Coppa Italia.

Summary 
Prior to the 1962–63 season, Helenio Herrera was confirmed despite a doping scandal. The main signing was Jair da Costa, summoned-up after the World Cup from the Brazilian team.

Inter suffered a very poor start to the season: the side collected just seven points in the first seven games, winning only twice before beating six of eight of the next opponents. In early January they moved into second place, a point behind Juventus. The second half of the season marked a clear comeback, with 21 points earned until late April. With three games left, Inter won away due to Mazzola's goal: the next week Inter lost 3–0 by Roma, but stayed in first placed, due to Juventus' draw in Mantua. Inter ended with 49 points, four over Juventus and six over Milan. It was the first national title under Angelo Moratti's leadership, and the first in 10 years since 1952–53.

Squad

Transfers

Competitions

Serie A

League table

Results by round

Matches

Coppa Italia

First round

Eightfinals

Statistics

Players statistics

See also 
 History of Grande Inter

References 

Inter Milan seasons
1962–63
Inter